The 2015 Atlantic Sun Conference men's soccer tournament, the 37th edition of the tournament, determined the Atlantic Sun Conference's automatic berth into the 2015 NCAA Division I Men's Soccer Championship.

The North Florida Ospreys won the tournament, besting the USC Upstate Spartans in the championship match. The 7–0 winning scoreline was the second most lopsided scoreline in an Atlantic Sun championship, and the largest since 1979.

This was the final edition of the tournament held under the "Atlantic Sun" or "A-Sun" branding. In April 2016, the conference announced a rebranding as the ASUN Conference.

Qualification 

The top five teams in the Atlantic Sun Conference, based on their conference regular-season records, qualified for the tournament.

Bracket

Schedule

First round

Semifinals

Championship

Statistical leaders

Top goalscorers

Tournament Best XI 

On November 15, the Atlantic Sun Conference determined the tournament's best XI

See also 
 ASUN Conference
 2015 Atlantic Sun Conference men's soccer season
 2015 NCAA Division I men's soccer season
 2015 NCAA Division I Men's Soccer Championship

References 

ASUN Men's Soccer Tournament
Atlantic Sun Conference Men's Soccer Tournament
Atlantic Sun Conference Men's Soccer Tournament